The Lonely Passion of Judith Hearne is a 1987 British drama film made by  HandMade Films Ltd. and United British Artists (UBA) starring Maggie Smith and Bob Hoskins. It was directed by Jack Clayton (his final theatrical film) and produced by Richard Johnson and Peter Nelson, with George Harrison and Denis O'Brien as executive producers. The music score was by Georges Delerue and the cinematography by Peter Hannan.

The screenplay was by Peter Nelson from the novel Judith Hearne by Northern Irish-Canadian writer Brian Moore. The story presents "a character study film about a woman's rage against the Church for her wasted life". Moore wrote the novel after leaving Ireland, in part because of the religious conflict there, and was living in Canada. The book was published in 1955 and was optioned for the stage and screen almost immediately. John Huston optioned it for a film with Katharine Hepburn. Director Irvin Kershner planned on casting Deborah Kerr. Eventually, Jack Clayton, a Catholic himself, was chosen to direct.

The cast also features Wendy Hiller, Marie Kean, Ian McNeice, Alan Devlin, Prunella Scales, Sheila Reid, and Aidan Gillen in his first film appearance. The novel is set in Belfast, but for the film the story was relocated to Dublin.

BBC Radio 4 produced a radio drama adaptation directed by Michael Quinn in 1995.

Plot
Judith Hearne is a lonely, middle-aged, Irish spinster from a good family in distressed circumstances who gives piano lessons independently but is losing pupils. After moving into a rooming house in Dublin, she meets and becomes attracted to the landlady’s widowed brother, the charming James Madden, who has returned from the United States. Madden notices her inherited jewellery and believes wrongly that she is reasonably well-off and might invest in his business idea.

Cast
 Maggie Smith as Judith Hearne
 Bob Hoskins as James Madden
 Wendy Hiller as Aunt D'Arcy
 Marie Kean as Mrs. Rice
 Ian McNeice as Bernard Rice
 Prunella Scales as Moira O'Neill
 Peter Gilmore as  Kevin O'Neill
 Aine Ni Mhuiri as Edie Marinan
 Kate Binchy as Sister Ignatius
 Rudi Davies as Mary

Reception
Pauline Kael wrote: "Clayton is a felicitous choice to direct a character study film about a woman's rage against the Church for her wasted life. His  first feature was Room at the Top with Simone Signoret and he made The Innocents with Deborah Kerr and The Pumpkin Eater with Anne Bancroft – he knows how to show women's temperatures and their mind-body inter-actions. Maggie Smith becomes the essence of spinster – she makes you feel the ghastliness of knowing you're  a figure of fun." Janet Maslin, writing in The New York Times, called the film "ponderous" and "literal" and thought the novel far superior to the film's "awkward" screenplay. She praised much of the acting, but thought Bob Hoskins was "paralyzed by the crude Americanism of his character".

Awards
Maggie Smith won the British Academy Film Award for Best Actress. She also won the Evening Standard British Film Award for Best Actress (tying with Billie Whitelaw for The Dressmaker). Bob Hoskins won the Best Actor award (also for Who Framed Roger Rabbit).

References

External links
 
 

1987 films
1987 drama films
1987 independent films
British drama films
British independent films
Films based on novels by Brian Moore
Films directed by Jack Clayton
Films scored by Georges Delerue
Films set in Dublin (city)
Films shot in the Republic of Ireland
HandMade Films films
1980s English-language films
1980s British films